Jorge Rios (born July 7, 1972, in Paços de Ferreira, Portugal) was a professional road racing cyclist from 1992 to 2010, where he decided to end his career as a professional road racing cyclist. Is known to have obtained 46 Mountain Jerseys in his career.

Results 

Mountain Jerseys
1991, Tour des Pyrénées - Vuelta a los Pirineos 
1992, Tour des Pyrénées - Vuelta a los Pirineos 
1993, Tour des Pyrénées - Vuelta a los Pirineos 
1994, Volta Ciclista Provincia Tarragona
1994, Tour des Pyrénées - Vuelta a los Pirineos 
1995, Vuelta Ciclista a Aragón
1995, Tour des Pyrénées - Vuelta a los Pirineos 
1995, Vuelta Ciclista Internacional a Extremadura
1996, Vuelta Ciclista Internacional a Extremadura
1996, Tour des Pyrénées - Vuelta a los Pirineos 
1997, Tour des Pyrénées - Vuelta a los Pirineos 
1997, Vuelta Ciclista Internacional a Extremadura
1998, Vuelta Ciclista a la Rioja
1998, Vuelta Ciclista a Navarra
1998, Tour des Pyrénées - Vuelta a los Pirineos
1999, Vuelta Ciclista a la Rioja
1999, Volta Ciclista Provincia Tarragona
1999, Vuelta a Tenerife
2000, Tour des Pyrénées - Vuelta a los Pirineos
2000, Vuelta a la Argentina
2001, Vuelta Ciclista del Uruguay
2001, Vuelta Ciclista a la Republica del Ecuador
2001, Vuelta a Venezuela
2001, Tour des Pyrénées - Vuelta a los Pirineos
2002, Vuelta a Venezuela
2002, Vuelta Ciclista del Uruguay
2002, Vuelta Ciclista de Chile
2003, Vuelta Ciclista del Uruguay
2003, Vuelta a Venezuela
2003, Vuelta a Guatemala
2004, Vuelta a Venezuela
2004, Vuelta a Guatemala
2004, Vuelta a Costa Rica
2005, Vuelta a Perú
2005, Vuelta a Venezuela
2005, Vuelta Mazatlán
2006, Tour des Pyrénées - Vuelta a los Pirineos
2007, Vuelta a Perú
2007, Vuelta Ciclista a la Republica del Ecuador
2008, Volta a Coruña
2008, Volta a Galicia
2008, Vuelta a Ávila
2009, Vuelta a Tenerife
2009, Volta Ciclista Provincia Tarragona
2010, Vuelta el Salvador
2010, Vuelta Ciclista del Uruguay

Races
1st, Overall, Vuelta a Perú

External links

Profile
Google documents  

Portuguese male cyclists
1972 births
Living people
People from Paços de Ferreira
Sportspeople from Porto District